Balajied Kupar Synrem is an Indian politician in the United Democratic Party. He was elected as a member of Meghalaya Legislative Assembly from Shella on 24 October 2019.

References

United Democratic Party (Meghalaya) politicians
Living people
Meghalaya MLAs 2018–2023
Year of birth missing (living people)